G-Star (sometimes also written G*STAR, G★ or G★STAR) is an annual trade show for the video game industry presented by Korea Association of Game Industry and Busan IT Promotion Agency in November. Originally held in the Seoul Capital Area, it was relocated to Busan in 2009.

Attendees 
Being a show focused on the South Korean game market, the show has a large number of online game companies, including local operators NCsoft, Hangame, NHN Entertainment, KakaoGames, Nexon, and Webzen, as well as overseas companies, such as Activision-Blizzard.

Attendance numbers

See also 
 Korea Game Awards

References 

 http://kotaku.com/tag/g-star
 https://www.engadget.com/tag/G-Star/

External links 
 Official website

2005 establishments in South Korea
Autumn events in South Korea
Exhibitions in South Korea
Video game trade shows
Video gaming in South Korea